Yeo Sang-Yeop (Hangul: 여상엽, born 22 July 1984) is a South Korean speed skater. He represented his country at the 2002 Winter Olympics in Salt Lake City. In Salt Lake City where he finished in 42nd position at the 1500m. In his second Winter Olympics in 2006, Torino, He competed at 5000m. He finished 28th at the 5000m.

He won the bronze medal in 2003 Asian Winter Games at the 1500m, and won the silver medal in 2007 Asian Winter Games at the 5000m.

Personal records
 500m — 37.35 (17 November 2002, Erfurt)
 1000m — 1:15.86 (27 December 2000, Seoul)
 1500m — 1:50.60 (8 November 2008, Berlin)
 3000m — 3:55.03 (17 November 2002, Erfurt)
 5000m — 6:28.49 (19 November 2005, Salt Lake City)
 10000m — 13:55.11 (4 December 2005, Heerenveen)

External links
skateresults
olympic statistics

Living people
1984 births
South Korean male speed skaters
Olympic speed skaters of South Korea
Speed skaters at the 2002 Winter Olympics
Speed skaters at the 2006 Winter Olympics
Asian Games medalists in speed skating
Speed skaters at the 2003 Asian Winter Games
Speed skaters at the 2007 Asian Winter Games
Medalists at the 2007 Winter Universiade
Asian Games silver medalists for South Korea
Asian Games bronze medalists for South Korea
Medalists at the 2003 Asian Winter Games
Medalists at the 2007 Asian Winter Games
Universiade silver medalists for South Korea
Universiade medalists in speed skating
Speed skaters at the 2007 Winter Universiade
Competitors at the 2009 Winter Universiade